Julian-Maurice Derstroff (born 5 January 1992) is a German professional footballer who plays as a forward for Mainz 05 II. He played for 1. FC Kaiserslautern, Borussia Dortmund II, 1. FSV Mainz 05 II and SV Sandhausen before joining Regensburg.

Career
Derstroff was born in Zweibrücken, and made his Bundesliga debut with 1. FC Kaiserslautern on 11 February 2012 in a 2–0 away loss to Bayern Munich.

References

External links
 
 Julian Derstroff at kicker.de

1992 births
Living people
People from Zweibrücken
Footballers from Rhineland-Palatinate
German footballers
Germany youth international footballers
Association football forwards
1. FC Kaiserslautern players
1. FC Kaiserslautern II players
Borussia Dortmund II players
1. FSV Mainz 05 II players
SV Sandhausen players
SSV Jahn Regensburg players
Hallescher FC players
Bundesliga players
2. Bundesliga players
3. Liga players
Regionalliga players
Oberliga (football) players